The Sony FE 85mm F1.4 GM is a premium short telephoto full-frame prime lens for the Sony E-mount, released by Sony on February 3, 2016.

The lens is Sony's first native lens offering for the 85mm focal length. Though designed for Sony's full frame E-mount cameras, the lens can be used on Sony's APS-C E-mount camera bodies, with an equivalent full-frame field-of-view of 127.5mm.

Build quality
The lens features a weather resistant plastic exterior over plastic internals with a matte black finish. It showcases recessed front lens element, focusing ring, and aperture ring. On the side of the lens is a programmable focus-hold button, Autofocus-Manual focus switch, and the red G-Master branding.

Image quality
The lens is one of Sony's sharpest offerings for their E-mount cameras. The lens suffers from almost no vignetting, visible distortion or chromatic aberration. The Bokeh produced by the lens at its maximum aperture is smooth.

See also
List of Sony E-mount lenses
Sony FE 85mm F1.8
Zeiss Batis 85mm F1.8

References

Camera lenses introduced in 2016
85